The Hellenic Centre is a non-profit, non-governmental organisation located at 16-18 Paddington Street, London. The Hellenic Centre is a cultural organisation founded run by the Hellenic Community Trust, a company limited by guarantee, and registered charity in 1994.

As a project of the Hellenic Community Trust, the Hellenic Centre is run by the trustees and their Executive Board, who are all volunteers. A full time director manages the centre on a day-to-day basis, with the necessary administrative support.

Awards and recognition 
Athens Academy Award - 24 March 2011

History 
There were many attempts to establish such a centre before but the breakthrough arrived in 1992 with a combination of trustees, fund-raising and our now permanent venue.

The Hellenic Centre is located in an early 20th century Portland stone and red brick building in the charming and sought-after area just off Marylebone High Street in central London.  This was purchased with the help of generous donations and support from many individuals and organisations amongst them the A G Leventis Foundation, Fafalios Shipping SA, the Bank of Cyprus London Ltd, the Michael Marks Foundation, and the Governments of Greece and Cyprus.

The Hellenic Community Trust was established as a charitable body to take ownership of the building, and an appeal was then launched to raise further money needed for the renovations and refurbishment that were required to provide a number of meeting and exhibition rooms, including the Great Hall.

The centre was blessed by the ecumenical patriarch Bartholomew I in 1993, and officially inaugurated on November 18, 1994, by the president of the Republic of Cyprus Glafcos Clerides.

Building History 

The building that now housed the Hellenic Centre was commissioned in 1910 from the architectural practice of Forsyth and Maule by Allan Broman (1861-1947), a pioneer of Swedish medical gymnastics and massage—a forerunner of modern physiotherapy. This system of exercise was invented in Stockholm in the early nineteenth century by Per Henrik Ling as a way to improve the physical fitness of schoolchildren, the army and the general population, and to promote recovery after illness. The building also contained lecture halls and classrooms for training teachers of the Swedish system.

The building's life as a Swedish gymnasium was brief. In 1914, with the sudden outbreak of war, it was transformed into the Swedish War Hospital for British Wounded; a stone inscription to the left of the front door commemorates that part of its history. The Great Hall was filled with iron cots for the 526 patients (464 of them officers) who were treated there for shell shock, gas poisoning, trench fever and wounds from shell splinters, shrapnel and machine-gun fire. Foreshadowing what was to come, concerts were given for the men to relieve the monotony.

Two pioneering operations joining severed nerve ends were performed in the hospital's modern operating theatres, whose equipment included sophisticated X-ray machines. King George V and Queen Mary were given a tour of the hospital, during which the lift—a newfangled piece of machinery—unfortunately broke down, trapping the royal couple for an unknown length of time.

After the war, Broman sold the building to the London County Council as a teacher training college for physical education. The high walls of the Great Hall were lined with gymnastic bars, and exercise mats replaced the hospital beds on the floor. Both male and female instructors were employed; by the 1960s, photographs show women only classes with updated equipment and a basketball net on the far wall. In later years the building was used to train women to teach adult physical education.

Eventually the building passed to the Inner London Education Authority, but with its abolition in 1990, the training college closed. With the help of several generous donors, the Hellenic Community Trust acquired the premises for £1.25 million in 1992. Two years later, after an elegant conversion preserving many of its fine original features (including some of the gymnastic equipment, transformed into modern sculptures by the artist George Kyriakou), the building was reopened as the Hellenic Centre.

References

External links

Greece–United Kingdom relations
Charities based in London